John Huston (1906–1987) was an American screenwriter, actor and director (father of actress Anjelica Huston, director Danny Huston and Tony Huston)

John Huston may also refer to:

John Huston (golfer) (born 1961), American professional golfer
John Huston (polar explorer) (born 1974), American explorer
John Huston (politician) (1710–1795), politician in Nova Scotia

See also
John Houston (disambiguation)